Pop Tart is an album from Little Nobody released on IF? Records in September, 1998.

Track listing
 "Sparkplug"
 "Nobody's Driving"
 "Tobacco-stained Mountain Goat"
 "Fear of a Black Bat"
 "Zone Troopers"
 "We Call It Crack House"
 "Nobody's Driving (Pharmaceutical Mix)"
 "Pineapple Slice"
 "Alright Already!"
 "Fuyu"
 "Demented Discotheque"
 "Old Skool Gangsta Slap"
 "Goddammit"
 "Nobody's Driving (Nobody's Looking Mix)"
 "Nobody's Driving (Houston Mix)"

Personnel
Andrez Bergen - Samples, Composition, Engineering
Francois Tetaz - Engineering, Mastering
Elenor Rayner - Keyboards (Tracks 8 and 13)
Nicole Skeltys - Remix (Track 7)
Blimp - Remix (Track 14)
Dee Dee - Remix (Track 15)

References

1998 albums
Little Nobody albums